Hargun Das Ahuja is a Pakistani politician who had been a Member of the Provincial Assembly of Sindh, from May 2016 to May 2018.

Early life and education
He was born on 1 March 1970 in Larkana.

He has done Bachelor of Arts from Shah Abdul Latif University.

Political career

He was elected to the Provincial Assembly of Sindh as a candidate of Muttahida Qaumi Movement on reserved seat for minorities in May 2016.

References

Living people
Sindh MPAs 2013–2018
Muttahida Qaumi Movement politicians
1970 births